Charles Parker Jr. (August 29, 1920 – March 12, 1955), nicknamed "Bird" or "Yardbird", was an American jazz saxophonist, band leader and composer. Parker was a highly influential soloist and leading figure in the development of bebop, a form of jazz characterized by fast tempos, virtuosic technique, and advanced harmonies. Parker was an extremely brilliant virtuoso and introduced revolutionary rhythmic and harmonic ideas into jazz, including rapid passing chords, new variants of altered chords, and chord substitutions. Primarily a player of the alto saxophone, Parker's tone ranged from clean and penetrating to sweet and somber.

Parker acquired the nickname "Yardbird" early in his career on the road with Jay McShann. This, and the shortened form "Bird", continued to be used for the rest of his life, inspiring the titles of a number of Parker compositions, such as "Yardbird Suite", "Ornithology", "Bird Gets the Worm", and "Bird of Paradise". 

Parker was an icon for the hipster subculture and later the Beat Generation, personifying the jazz musician as an uncompromising artist and intellectual rather than just an entertainer.

Biography

Childhood
Charles Parker Jr. was born in Kansas City, Kansas, at 852 Freeman Avenue, and raised in Kansas City, Missouri, near Westport and later –  in high school – near 15th and Olive St. to Charles Parker Sr. and Adelaide "Addie" Bailey, who was of mixed Choctaw and African-American background. He attended Lincoln High School in September 1934, but withdrew in December 1935, just before joining the local musicians' union and choosing to pursue his musical career full-time. His childhood sweetheart and future wife, Rebecca Ruffin, graduated from Lincoln High School in June 1935.

Parker began playing the saxophone at age 11, and at age 14 he joined his high school band where he studied under bandmaster Alonzo Lewis. His mother purchased a new alto saxophone around the same time. His father was often required to travel for work, but provided some musical influence because he was a pianist, dancer and singer on the Theatre Owners Booking Association (T.O.B.A.) circuit, later becoming a Pullman waiter or chef on the railways. Parker's mother, Addie, worked nights at the local Western Union office. His biggest influence at that time was a young trombone player named Robert Simpson, who taught him the basics of improvisation.

Early career
In the mid-1930s, Parker began to practice diligently. During this period he mastered improvisation and developed some of the ideas that led to the later development of bebop. In an interview with Paul Desmond, Parker said that he spent three to four years practicing up to 15 hours a day.

Bands led by Count Basie and Bennie Moten certainly influenced Parker. He played with local bands in jazz clubs around Kansas City, Missouri, where he perfected his technique, with the assistance of Buster Smith, whose dynamic transitions to double and triple time influenced Parker's developing style.

In late spring 1936, Parker played at a jam session at the Reno Club in Kansas City. His attempt to improvise failed when he lost track of the chord changes. This prompted Jo Jones, the drummer for Count Basie's Orchestra, to contemptuously take a cymbal off of his drum set and throw it at his feet as a signal to leave the stage. Rather than becoming discouraged, Parker vowed to practice harder; the incident was a seminal moment in his career and he returned as a new man a year later. Parker proposed to Rebecca Ruffin the same year and the two were married on July 25, 1936. In the fall of 1936, Parker traveled with a band from Kansas City to the Ozarks for the opening of Clarence Musser's Tavern south of Eldon, Missouri. Along the way, the caravan of musicians had a car accident and Parker broke three ribs and fractured his spine. The accident led to Parker's ultimate troubles with painkillers and opioids, especially heroin. Parker struggled with drug use for the rest of his life.

Despite his near-death experience on the way to the Ozarks in 1936, Parker returned to the area in 1937 where he spent a great deal of time woodshedding and developing his sound. In 1938 Parker joined pianist Jay McShann's territory band. The band toured nightclubs and other venues of the southwest, as well as Chicago and New York City. Parker made his professional recording debut with McShann's band.

New York City
In 1939 Parker moved to New York City, to pursue a career in music. He held several other jobs as well. He worked for nine dollars a week as a dishwasher at Jimmie's Chicken Shack, where pianist Art Tatum performed. It was in 1939 in New York that Parker had his musical breakthrough that had begun in 1937 in the Missouri Ozarks. Playing through the changes on the song "Cherokee", Parker discovered a new musical vocabulary and sound that shifted the course of music history.

In 1940, he returned to Kansas City to perform with Jay McShann and to attend the funeral of his father, Charles Sr. He played Fairyland Park in the summer with McShann's band at 75th and Prospect for all-white audiences. The up-side of the summer was his introduction to Dizzy Gillespie by Step-Buddy Anderson near 19th and Vine in the summer of 1940. 

In 1942 Parker left McShann's band and played for one year with Earl Hines, whose band included Dizzy Gillespie, who later played with Parker as a duo. This period is virtually undocumented, due to the strike of 1942–1943 by the American Federation of Musicians, during which time few professional recordings were made. Parker joined a group of young musicians, and played in after-hours clubs in Harlem, such as Clark Monroe's Uptown House. These young iconoclasts included Gillespie, pianist Thelonious Monk, guitarist Charlie Christian, and drummer Kenny Clarke. According to Mary Lou Williams, the group was formed in order "to challenge the practice of downtown musicians coming uptown and 'stealing' the music." She recalled: "Monk and some of the cleverest of the young musicians used to complain: 'We'll never get credit for what we're doing.' They had reason to say it... In the music business the going is tough for original talent. Everybody is being exploited through paid-for publicity and most anybody can become a great name if he can afford enough of it. In the end the public believes what it reads. So it is often difficult for the real talent to break through... Anyway, Monk said: 'We're going to get a big band started. We're going to create something they can't steal, because they can't play it.'"

Bebop

One night in 1939, Parker was playing "Cherokee" in a practice session with guitarist William "Biddy" Fleet when he hit upon a method for developing his solos that enabled one of his main musical innovations. He realized that the 12 semitones of the chromatic scale can lead melodically to any key, breaking some of the confines of simpler jazz soloing. He recalled: "I was jamming in a chili house on Seventh Avenue between 139th and 140th. It was December 1939. Now I'd been getting bored with the stereotyped changes that were being used all the time at the time, and I kept thinking there's bound to be something else. I could hear it sometimes but I couldn't play it ... Well, that night I was working over 'Cherokee' and, as I did, I found that by using the higher intervals of a chord as a melody line and backing them with appropriately related changes, I could play the thing I'd been hearing. I came alive."

Early in its development, this new type of jazz was rejected by many of the established, traditional jazz musicians who disdained their younger counterparts. The beboppers responded by calling these traditionalists "moldy figs". However, some musicians, such as Coleman Hawkins and Tatum, were more positive about its development, and participated in jam sessions and recording dates in the new approach with its adherents.

Because of the two-year Musicians' Union ban of all commercial recordings from 1942 to 1944, much of bebop's early development was not captured for posterity. As a result, it gained limited radio exposure. Bebop musicians had a difficult time gaining widespread recognition. It was not until 1945, when the recording ban was lifted, that Parker's collaborations with Dizzy Gillespie, Max Roach, Bud Powell and others had a substantial effect on the jazz world. (One of their first small-group performances together was rediscovered and issued in 2005: a concert in New York's Town Hall on June 22, 1945.) Bebop soon gained wider appeal among musicians and fans alike.

On November 26, 1945, Parker led a record date for the Savoy label, marketed as the "greatest Jazz session ever". Recording as Charlie Parker's Reboppers, Parker enlisted such sidemen as Gillespie and Miles Davis on trumpet, Curley Russell on bass and Max Roach on drums. The tracks recorded during this session include "Ko-Ko", "Billie's Bounce", and "Now's the Time".

In December 1945, the Parker band traveled to an unsuccessful engagement at Billy Berg's club in Los Angeles. Most of the group returned to New York, but Parker remained in California, cashing in his return ticket to buy heroin. He experienced great hardship in California, and was briefly jailed after setting the bed sheets of his Los Angeles hotel room on fire and then running naked through the lobby while intoxicated, after which he was committed to the Camarillo State Mental Hospital for six months.

When Parker received his discharge from the hospital, he was clean and healthy. Before leaving California, he recorded "Relaxin' at Camarillo" in reference to his stay in the mental hospital. However, when he returned to New York he resumed his heroin usage. During this time he still managed to record dozens of sides for the Savoy and Dial labels, which remain some of the high points of his recorded output. Many of these were with his so-called "classic quintet" including Davis and Roach.

In 1952, Parker and Gillespie released an album entitled Bird and Diz.

Charlie Parker with Strings

A longstanding desire of Parker's had been to perform with a string section. He was a keen student of classical music, and contemporaries reported he was most interested in the music and formal innovations of Igor Stravinsky and longed to engage in a project akin to what later became known as Third Stream, a new kind of music, incorporating both jazz and classical elements as opposed to merely incorporating a string section into performance of jazz standards. On November 30, 1949, Norman Granz arranged for Parker to record an album of ballads with a mixed group of jazz and chamber orchestra musicians. Six master takes from this session became the album Charlie Parker with Strings: "Just Friends", "Everything Happens to Me", "April in Paris", "Summertime", "I Didn't Know What Time It Was", and "If I Should Lose You".

Jazz at Massey Hall
In 1953, Parker performed at Massey Hall in Toronto, joined by Gillespie, Mingus, Powell and Roach. Unfortunately, the concert happened at the same time as a televised heavyweight boxing match between Rocky Marciano and Jersey Joe Walcott, so the musical event was poorly attended. Mingus recorded the concert, resulting in the album Jazz at Massey Hall. At this concert, Parker played a plastic Grafton saxophone.

Death

Parker died on March 12, 1955, in the suite of his friend and patron Baroness Pannonica de Koenigswarter at the Stanhope Hotel in New York City, while watching The Dorsey Brothers' Stage Show on television. The official causes of death were lobar pneumonia and a bleeding ulcer, but Parker also had an advanced case of cirrhosis and had suffered a heart attack. The coroner who performed his autopsy mistakenly estimated Parker's 34-year-old body to be between 50 and 60 years of age.

Since 1950, Parker had been living in New York City with his common-law wife, Chan Berg, the mother of his son, Baird (who died 2014) and his daughter Pree (who died at age 3). He considered Chan his wife, although he never married her, nor did he divorce his previous wife, Doris, whom he had married in 1948. His marital status complicated the settling of Parker's estate and would ultimately serve to frustrate his wish to be quietly interred in New York City.

Dizzy Gillespie paid for the funeral arrangements and organized a lying-in-state, a Harlem procession officiated by Congressman and Reverend Adam Clayton Powell, Jr., as well as a memorial concert. Parker's body was flown back to Missouri, in accordance with his mother's wishes. Berg criticized Doris and Parker's family for giving him a Christian funeral, even though they knew he was a confirmed atheist. Parker was buried at Lincoln Cemetery in Missouri, in a hamlet known as Blue Summit, located close to I-435 and East Truman Road.

Parker's estate is managed by Jampol Artist Management.

Some amount of controversy continued after Parker's burial in the Kansas City area. His tomb was engraved with the image of a tenor saxophone, though Parker is primarily associated with the alto saxophone. Later, some people wanted to move Parker's remains to reinforce redevelopment of the historic 18th and Vine area.

Personal life
Parker's life was riddled with mental health problems and an addiction to heroin. Although unclear which came first, his addiction to opiates began at the age of 16, when he was injured in a car crash and a doctor prescribed morphine for the pain. The addiction that stemmed from this incident led him to miss performances, and to be considered unreliable. In the jazz scene heroin use was prevalent, and the substance could be acquired with little difficulty.

Although he produced many brilliant recordings during this period, Parker's behavior became increasingly erratic. Heroin was difficult to obtain once he moved to California, where the drug was less abundant, so he used alcohol as a substitute. A recording for the Dial label from July 29, 1946, provides evidence of his condition. Before this session, Parker drank a quart of whiskey. According to the liner notes of Charlie Parker on Dial Volume 1, Parker missed most of the first two bars of his first chorus on the track "Max Making Wax". When he finally did come in, he swayed wildly and once spun all the way around, away from his microphone. On the next tune, "Lover Man", producer Ross Russell physically supported Parker. On "Bebop" (the final track Parker recorded that evening) he begins a solo with a solid first eight bars; on his second eight bars, however, he begins to struggle, and a desperate Howard McGhee, the trumpeter on this session, shouts, "Blow!" at him. Charles Mingus considered this version of "Lover Man" to be among Parker's greatest recordings, despite its flaws. Nevertheless, Parker hated the recording and never forgave Ross Russell for releasing it. He re-recorded the tune in 1951 for Verve.

Parker's life took a turn for the worse in March 1954 when his three-year-old daughter Pree died of cystic fibrosis and pneumonia. He attempted suicide twice in 1954, which once again landed him in a mental hospital. On March 12, 1955, while visiting his friend, the “jazz baroness” Nica de Koenigswarter, Charlie Parker died. The coroner cited pneumonia as the cause, and estimated Parker’s age at fifty-five or sixty. He was only thirty-four.

Artistry
Parker's style of composition involved interpolation of original melodies over existing jazz forms and standards, a practice known as contrafact and still common in jazz today. Examples include "Ornithology" (which borrows the chord progression of jazz standard "How High the Moon" and is said to be co-written with trumpet player Little Benny Harris), and "Moose The Mooche" (one of many Parker compositions based on the chord progression of "I Got Rhythm"). The practice was not uncommon prior to bebop, but it became a signature of the movement as artists began to move away from arranging popular standards and toward composing their own material. Perhaps Parker's most well-known contrafact is "Koko," which is based on the chord changes of the popular bebop tune "Cherokee," written by Ray Noble.

While tunes such as "Now's The Time", "Billie's Bounce", "Au Privave", "Barbados", "Relaxin' at Camarillo", "Bloomdido", and "Cool Blues" were based on conventional 12-bar blues changes, Parker also created a unique version of the 12-bar blues for tunes such as "Blues for Alice", "Laird Baird", and "Si Si." These unique chords are known popularly as "Bird Changes". Like his solos, some of his compositions are characterized by long, complex melodic lines and a minimum of repetition, although he did employ the use of repetition in some tunes, most notably "Now's The Time".

Parker contributed greatly to the modern jazz solo, one in which triplets and pick-up notes were used in unorthodox ways to lead into chord tones, affording the soloist more freedom to use passing tones, which soloists previously avoided. Parker was admired for his unique style of phrasing and innovative use of rhythm. Through his recordings and the popularity of the posthumously published Charlie Parker Omnibook, Parker's identifiable style dominated jazz for many years to come.

Other well-known Parker compositions include "Ah-Leu-Cha", "Anthropology", co-written with Gillespie, "Confirmation", "Constellation", "Moose the Mooche", "Scrapple from the Apple" and "Yardbird Suite", the vocal version of which is called "What Price Love", with lyrics by Parker.

Miles Davis once said, "You can tell the history of jazz in four words: Louis Armstrong. Charlie Parker".

Discography

Recognition

Awards

Grammy Award

Grammy Hall of Fame

Recordings of Charlie Parker were inducted into the Grammy Hall of Fame, which is a special Grammy award established in 1973 to honor recordings that are at least twenty-five years old, and that have "qualitative or historical significance".

Inductions

Government honors
In 1995, the U.S. Postal Service issued a 32-cent commemorative postage stamp in Parker's honor.

In 2002, the Library of Congress honored his recording "Ko-Ko" (1945) by adding it to the National Recording Registry.

Charlie Parker residence

From 1950 to 1954, Parker lived with Chan Berg on the ground floor of the townhouse at 151 Avenue B, across from Tompkins Square Park on Manhattan's Lower East Side. The Gothic Revival building, which was built about 1849, was added to the National Register of Historic Places in 1994 and was designated a New York City landmark in 1999. Avenue B between East 7th and East 10th Streets was given the honorary designation "Charlie Parker Place" in 1992.

Musical tributes
 Jack Kerouac's spoken poem "Charlie Parker" to backing piano by Steve Allen on Poetry for the Beat Generation (1959)
 In 2014, saxophonist and bandleader Aaron Johnson produced historically accurate recreations of the Charlie Parker with Strings albums.
 Lennie Tristano's overdubbed solo piano piece "Requiem" was recorded in tribute to Parker shortly after his death.
 American composer Moondog wrote his famous "Bird's Lament" in his memory; published on the 1969 album Moondog.
 Since 1972, the Californian ensemble Supersax harmonized many of Parker's improvisations for a five-piece saxophone section.
 In 1973, guitarist Joe Pass released his album I Remember Charlie Parker in Parker's honor.
 Weather Report's jazz fusion track and highly acclaimed big band standard "Birdland", from the Heavy Weather album (1977), was a dedication by bandleader Joe Zawinul to both Charlie Parker and the New York 52nd Street club itself.
 The biographical song "Parker's Band" was recorded by Steely Dan on its 1974 album Pretzel Logic.
 Avant-garde jazz trombonist George E. Lewis recorded Homage to Charles Parker (1979).
 The opera Charlie Parker's Yardbird by Daniel Schnyder, libretto by Bridgette A. Wimberly, was premiered by Opera Philadelphia on June 5, 2015, with Lawrence Brownlee in the title role.
 The name of British 1960s blues-rock band The Yardbirds was at least partially inspired by Parker's nickname.
 Charles Mingus' song "Reincarnation of a Lovebird"
 In 1993, Anthony Braxton recorded a 2-CD album titled Charlie Parker Project, released in 1995. This material was re-released in 2018 as part of an 11-CD set titled Sextet (Parker) 1993.

Other tributes
 In 1949, the New York night club Birdland was named in his honor. Three years later, George Shearing wrote "Lullaby of Birdland", named for both Parker and the nightclub.
 The 1957 short story "Sonny's Blues" by James Baldwin features a jazz/blues playing virtuoso who names Bird as the "greatest" jazz musician, whose style he hopes to emulate.
 In 1959, Jack Kerouac completed his only full-length poetry work, Mexico City Blues, with two poems about Parker's  importance, writing in those works that Parker's contribution to music was comparable to Ludwig van Beethoven's.
 The 1959 Beat comedy album How to Speak Hip,  by comedians Del Close and John Brent, lists the three top most "uncool" actions (both in the audio and in the liner notes) as follows: "It is uncool to claim that you used to room with Bird. It is uncool to claim that you have Bird's axe. It is even less cool to ask 'Who is Bird?'"
 The Charlie Parker Jazz Festival is a free two-day music festival that takes place every summer on the last weekend of August in Manhattan, New York City, at Marcus Garvey Park in Harlem and Tompkins Square Park in the Lower East Side, sponsored by the non-profit organization City Parks Foundation.
 The Annual Charlie Parker Celebration is an annual festival held in Kansas City, Kansas since 2014. It is held for 10 days and celebrates all aspects of Parker, from live jazz music and bootcamps, to tours of his haunts in the city, to exhibits at the American Jazz Museum.
 In the short-story collection Las armas secretas (The Secret Weapons), Julio Cortázar dedicated "El perseguidor" ("The Pursuer") to Charlie Parker. This story examines the last days of a drug-addicted saxophonist through the eyes of his biographer.
 In 1981, jazz historian Phil Schaap began to host Bird Flight, a radio show on WKCR New York dedicated entirely to Parker's music. The program continues to be broadcast on WKCR in 2022.
 In 1984, modern dance choreographer Alvin Ailey created the piece For Bird – With Love in honor of Parker. The piece chronicles his life from his early career to his failing health.
 A biographical film called Bird, starring Forest Whitaker as Parker and directed by Clint Eastwood, was released in 1988.
 In 1999 the Spanish metal band Saratoga created the song Charlie se Fue in honor of Charlie Parker, for the album Vientos de Guerra.
 In 2005, the Selmer Paris saxophone manufacturer commissioned a special "Tribute to Bird" alto saxophone, commemorating the 50th anniversary of Parker's death (1955–2005).
 Parker's performances of "I Remember You" (recorded for Clef Records in 1953, with the Charlie Parker Quartet, comprising Parker on alto sax, Al Haig on piano, Percy Heath on bass, and Max Roach on drums) and "Parker's Mood" (recorded for the Savoy label in 1948, with Parker on alto sax, John Lewis on piano, Curley Russell on bass, and Max Roach on drums) were selected by literary critic Harold Bloom for inclusion on his shortlist of the "twentieth-century American Sublime", the greatest works of American art produced in the 20th century. A vocalese version of "Parker's Mood" was a popular success for King Pleasure.
 Jean-Michel Basquiat created many paintings to honor Charlie Parker, including Charles the First, CPRKR, Bird on Money, Bird of Paradise, and Discography I.
 Charlie Watts, drummer for the Rolling Stones, wrote a children's book entitled Ode to a High Flying Bird as a tribute to Parker. Watts has cited Parker as a large influence on his life when he was a boy learning jazz.
 The 2014 film Whiplash repeatedly refers to the 1937 incident at the Reno Club, changing the aim point of the cymbals to his head and pointing to it as evidence that genius is not born but made by relentless practice and pitiless peers.
 Sculptor John Raimondi created an abstract sculpture dedicated to Charles Parker in 2002. Titled "Bird," the sculpture is fabricated from patinated bronze and stands 8 feet tall.

Citations

References

Bibliography

Further reading
 Aebersold, Jamey, editor (1978). Charlie Parker Omnibook. New York: Michael H. Goldsen.
 Koch, Lawrence (1999). Yardbird Suite: A Compendium of the Music and Life of Charlie Parker. Boston, Northeastern University Press. 
 Parker, Chan (1999). My Life In E-Flat. University Of South Carolina Press. 
 Woideck, Carl, editor (1998). The Charlie Parker Companion: Six Decades of Commentary. New York: Schirmer Books. 
 Yamaguchi, Masaya, editor (1955). Yardbird Originals. New York: Charles Colin, reprinted 2005.

External links

 The Official Site of Charlie "Yardbird" Parker
 Charlie Parker discography at Discogs
 Charlie Parker discography
 Charlie Parker Sessionography
 Clips and notes about Parker
 Bird Lives – Thinking About Charlie Parker
 Great Lives - Charlie Parker nominated by Ken Clarke

 
1920 births
1955 deaths
20th-century African-American musicians
20th-century American composers
20th-century atheists
20th-century jazz composers
20th-century saxophonists
African-American atheists
African-American jazz composers
African-American jazz musicians
African Americans in New York City
American atheists
American male jazz composers
American jazz composers
American male saxophonists
Bebop saxophonists
Grammy Lifetime Achievement Award winners
Deaths from pneumonia in New York City
Jazz alto saxophonists
Jazz musicians from Missouri
Jazz musicians from New York (state)
Musicians from Kansas City, Missouri
Musicians from New York City
People from Manhattan
Savoy Records artists
Verve Records artists
Alcohol-related deaths in New York City
Deaths from ulcers
Sonet Records artists
20th-century American male musicians